Baer's hylomyscus or Baer's wood mouse (Hylomyscus baeri) is a species of rodent in the family Muridae.
It is found in Ivory Coast, Ghana, and Sierra Leone.
Its natural habitat is subtropical or tropical moist lowland forests.
It is threatened by habitat loss.

References

 Schlitter, D., Decher, J. & Kerbis Peterhans, J. 2004.  Hylomyscus baeri.   2006 IUCN Red List of Threatened Species.   Downloaded on 19 July 2007.

Hylomyscus
Rodents of Africa
Mammals described in 1965
Taxonomy articles created by Polbot